Alaap are a British Asian live band credited as the founders of British Bhangra. In 2017, the BBC described the group as the 'most prolific' bhangra band.

History
The band formed in Southall, West London, in 1977. Originally a traditional bhangra band, they were prominent in the community circuit, playing at weddings and family gatherings in Southall. They had an early break on the BBC TV Asian programme, Nai Zindagi Naya Jeevan.

In 1978, they were discovered by talent scout Pran Gohill of Multitone Records and they recorded several albums with the label. Teri Chunni de Sitare (1979) was the first album to be recorded by a British bhangra group, and is widely recognised as marking the birth of the ‘Southall scene’.

In 1984, they began work with Deepak Kazanchi on the album Ten Chunm De Sitare, which introduced elements of contemporary electronic dance music into the band’s sound.

Legacy
The success of Ten Chunm De Sitare has been linked to the emergence of professional British Bhangra bands that along with Alaap have been dubbed the 'Southall sound', such as Herra and Holle.

Their songs were used in the films Yari Jatt Di (1984), Dil, and Hatya.

References

Indian diaspora in the United Kingdom
British world music groups